Pontic Greek (or   ; ,) is a variety of Modern Greek indigenous to the Pontus region on the southern shores of the Black Sea, northeastern Anatolia, and the Eastern Turkish/Caucasus region. Today it is spoken mainly in northern Greece. Its speakers are referred to as Pontic Greeks or Pontian Greeks.

The linguistic lineage of Pontic Greek stems from Ionic Greek via Koine and Byzantine Greek, and contains influences from Russian, Turkish, Armenian, and Kurdish.

Pontic Greek is an endangered Indo-European language spoken by about 778,000 people worldwide. Many Pontians live in Greece; however, only 200,000–300,000 of those are considered active Pontic speakers. Although it is mainly spoken in Northern Greece, it is also spoken in Turkey, Russia, Georgia, Armenia, and Kazakhstan, as well as by the Pontic diaspora. The language was brought to Greece in the 1920s after the population exchange between the Christian Pontic Greeks and the Turkish Muslims from their homelands during the 1923 population exchange between Greece and Turkey. However, it is still spoken in pockets of the Pontus today, mostly by Pontic Greek Muslims in the eastern districts of Trabzon Province. Pontic Greek is one of the languages of the Greek (Hellenic) branch separate from Mainland Greek. Pontic Greek and typical demotic, Mainland Greek is generally mutually unintelligible. It is primarily written in the Greek script; in Turkey and Ukraine the Latin script is used more frequently; in Russia and former Soviet countries, the Cyrillic alphabet is used.

Classification 
Pontic Greek is classified as an Indo-European, Greek language of the Attic-Ionic branch.

Name 
Historically, the speakers of Pontic Greek called it simply  (or), which is also a historical and colloquial term for Modern Greek in general. The term "Pontic" originated in scholarly usage, but it has been adopted as a mark of identity by Pontic Greeks living in Greece. Pontic Greeks in Greece may call their language .

Similarly, in Turkish, there is no special name for Pontic Greek; it is called , derived from the Turkish word Rum, denoting Byzantine Greeks.

History 
Similar to most modern Greek dialects, Pontic Greek is mainly derived from Koine Greek, which was spoken in the Hellenistic and Roman times between the 4th century BC and the 4th century AD. Following the Seljuk invasion of Asia Minor during the 11th century AD, Pontus became isolated from many of the regions of the Byzantine Empire. The Pontians remained somewhat isolated from the mainland Greeks, causing Pontic Greek to develop separately and distinctly from the rest of the mainland Greek. However, the language has also been influenced by the nearby Persian, Caucasian, and Turkish languages.

Dialects 
Greek linguist Manolis Triantafyllidis has divided the Pontic of Turkey into two groups:
the Western group (Oinountiac or ) around Oenoe (Turkish Ünye);
the Eastern group, which is again subdivided into:
the coastal subgroup (Trapezountiac) around Trebizond (Ancient Greek ) and
the inland subgroup (Chaldiot) in Chaldia (around Argyroupolis (Gümüşhane) and Kanin in Pontic), its vicinity (Kelkit, Baibourt, etc.), and around Kotyora (Ordu).

Speakers of Chaldiot were the most numerous. In phonology, some varieties of Pontic are reported to demonstrate vowel harmony, a well-known feature of Turkish (Mirambel 1965).

Outside Turkey one can distinguish:
the Northern group (Mariupol Greek or ), originally spoken in Crimea, but now principally in Mariupol, where the majority of Crimean Pontic Greeks of the Rumaiic subgroup now live. Other Pontic Greeks speak Crimean Tatar as their mother tongue, and are classified as "Urums". There are approximately half a dozen dialects of Crimean (Mariupolitan) Pontic Greek spoken.
Soviet Rumaiic, a Soviet variant of the Pontic Greek language spoken by the Pontic Greek population of the Soviet Union.

Ophitic 
The inhabitants of the Of valley who had converted to Islam in the 17th century remained in Turkey and have partly retained the Pontic language until today. Their dialect, which forms part of the Trapezountiac subgroup, is called "Ophitic" by linguists, but speakers generally call it . As few as 5,000 people are reported to speak it. There are however estimates that show the real number of the speakers as considerably higher. Speakers of Ophitic/Romeyka are concentrated in the eastern districts of Trabzon province: Çaykara (Katohor), Dernekpazarı (Kondu), Sürmene (Sourmena) and Köprübaşı (Göneşera). Although less widespread, it is still spoken in some remote villages of the Of district itself. It is also spoken in the western İkizdere (Dipotamos) district of Rize province. Historically the dialect was spoken in a wider area, stretching further east to the port town of Pazar (Athina).

Ophitic has retained the infinitive, which is present in Ancient Greek but has been lost in other variants of Modern Greek; it has therefore been characterized as "archaic" or conservative (even in relation to other Pontic dialects) and as the living language that is closest to Ancient Greek. Because a majority of the population of these districts converted to Islam during the 17th to 19th centuries, some Arabic and Turkish loanwords have been adopted in the language. According to Vahit Tursun, writer of the Romeika-Turkish dictionary, loanwords from the neighboring Laz speakers of Rize province are strikingly absent in the Romeika vocabulary of Trabzon natives.

A very similar dialect is spoken by descendants of Christians from the Of valley (especially from Kondu) now living in Greece in the village of Nea Trapezounta, Pieria, Central Macedonia, with about 400 speakers.

Geographic distribution 
Though Pontic was originally spoken on the southern shores of the Black Sea, from the 18th and 19th century and on substantial numbers migrated into the northern and eastern shores, into the Russian Empire. Pontic is still spoken by large numbers of people in Ukraine, mainly in Mariupol, but also in other parts of Ukraine such as the Odessa and Donetsk region, in Russia (around Stavropol) and Georgia. The language enjoyed some use as a literary medium in the 1930s, including a school grammar (Topkharas 1998 [1932]).

After the massacres of the 1910s, the majority of speakers remaining in Asia Minor were subject to the Treaty of Lausanne population exchange, and were resettled in Greece (mainly northern Greece). A second wave of migration occurred in the early 1990s, this time from countries of the former Soviet Union.

In urban areas in Greece the language is no longer spoken in daily life but in villages and towns with more homogeneous Pontic population, located mostly in the northern part of country, the language is still in active daily usage. Many radio stations broadcast in the Pontic language, and many associations exist for its safeguard.

 Greece: 400,000 speakers, mostly in Macedonia (East, Central and West) and in Attica
 Turkey: Unknown (certainly more than 5,000), mostly in eastern Black Sea Region and in Istanbul
 Of-dialectical region:
 Of: multiple villages
 Çaykara: (24–70 villages)
 Dernekpazarı: (13 villages)
 Köprübaşı: (5 villages)
 Sürmene: (31 villages)
 Rize: (21 villages, mostly in İkizdere district)
 To the west of Trabzon:
 Maçka: A handful of villages, settled from the Of-Çaykara region
 Tonya: (17 villages)
 Beşikdüzü: 1 village
 Giresun: (3 villages in Bulancak district)
 Gümüşhane: Sparsely in Torul-ardasa, Yağlıdere-kromni, Dumanlı
 Caucasus region
 Kars: Multiple villages and provincial capital.

Official status

Greece 
In Greece, Pontic has no official status, like all other Greek dialects.

Soviet Union 

Later revival of Greek identity in the Soviet Union and post-Communist Russia saw a renewed division on the issue of Rumaiic versus Demotic. A new attempt to preserve a sense of ethnic Rumaiic identity started in the mid-1980s. The Ukrainian scholar Andriy Biletsky created a new Slavonic alphabet, but though a number of writers and poets make use of this alphabet, the population of the region rarely uses it.

Culture 
The language has a rich oral tradition and folklore and Pontic songs are particularly popular in Greece. There is also some limited production of modern literature in Pontic, including poetry collections (among the most renowned writers is Kostas Diamantidis), novels, and translated Asterix comic albums. The youth often speak standard Greek as their first language. The use of Pontic has been maintained more by speakers in North America than it has in Greece.

Alphabets 
Pontic, in Turkey, is written in the Latin alphabet following Turkish conventions. In Russia, it is written in the Cyrillic alphabet. The Pontic Wikipedia uses Greek script: it has adopted εα, εο for these vowels, to avoid clashes with Modern Greek ια, ιο, and uses digraphs from the Soviet system instead of diacritics, but otherwise follows historical orthography.

Archaisms 

The following are features of Pontic Greek which have been retained from early forms of Greek, in contrast to the developments of Modern Greek.

Phonology 
 The vowel "η" sometimes merged with "ε" rather than "ι" (κέπιν = κήπιον, κλέφτες = κλέπτης, συνέλικος = συνήλικος, νύφε = νύ(μ)φη, έγκα = ἤνεγκον, έτον = ἦτον, έκουσα = ἤκουσα etc.).
 The vowel "ω" merged with "o" even in those cases where Koine Greek received it as "ου" (ζωμίν = ζουμί, καρβώνι, ρωθώνι etc.).
 Preservation of the Ionic consonant pair "" instead of Koine "" .

Declension of nouns and adjectives 
 Preservation of the ancient nominative suffix "" in neuter diminutive nouns from Ancient Greek "-" (Pontic ).
 Preservation of the termination of feminine compound adjectives in 
 The declension of masculine nouns from singular, nominative termination "" to genitive 
 The ancient accenting of nouns in vocative form:

Conjugation of verbs 
 The second aorist form in 
 The sporadic use of infinitives 
 Pontic  ("is") from Koine idiomatic form  (standard Ancient Greek ), compare the Biblical form  ("there is"), Modern Greek ine

Lexicology
 Pontic  ("ours") from Ancient Greek  in contrast to Modern Greek

Comparison with Ancient Greek 
 1. Attachment of the /e/ sound to the ancient infinitive suffix  (in Trapezountiac Pontic)
 {|
|-
| Pontic || Ancient
|-
|  || 
|-
|  || 
|-
|  || 
|-
|  || 
|-
|  || 
|-
|  || 
|-
|  || 
|-
|  || 
|-
|  || 
|-
|  || 
|-
|  || 
|-
|  || 
|}

 2. Preservation of the Ancient infinitive suffix 
 {|
|-
| Pontic || Ancient
|-
|  || 
|-
|  || 
|-
|  || 
|-
|  || 
|-
|  || 
|-
|  || 
|-
|  || 
|-
|  || 
|-
|  || 
|-
|  || 
|}

 3. Ancient first aorist infinitive suffix -αι has been replaced by second aorist suffix -ειν
 {|
|-
| Pontic || Ancient
|-
|  || 
|-
|  || 
|}

 4. Attachment of the /e/ sound to the ancient aorist infinitive suffix 
 

 5. Same aorist suffix  was also the regular perfect suffix)
 {|
|-
| Pontic || Ancient
|-
|  || 
|-
|  || 
|-
|  || 
|-
|  || 
|-
|  || 
|}

 6. Ancient Greek   infinitive > Pontic Greek   infinitive
 {|
|-
| Pontic || Ancient
|-
|  || ἐλθεῖν
|}

See also 
 Mariupolitan Greek
 Caucasus Greeks
 Cappadocian Greek

Further reading

Notes

Bibliography 
 Berikashvili, Svetlana. 2017. Morphological aspects of Pontic Greek spoken in Georgia. LINCOM GmbH. 
 Özhan Öztürk, Karadeniz: Ansiklopedik Sözlük. 2 Cilt. Heyamola Yayıncılık. İstanbul, 2005. 
 Τομπαΐδης, Δ.Ε. 1988. Η Ποντιακή Διάλεκτος. Αθήνα: Αρχείον Πόντου. (Tompaidis, D.E. 1988. The Pontic Dialect. Athens: Archeion Pontou.)
 Τομπαΐδης, Δ.Ε. ϗ Συμεωνίδης, Χ.Π. 2002. Συμπλήρωμα στο Ιστορικόν Λεξικόν της Ποντικής Διαλέκτου του Α.Α. Παπαδόπουλου. Αθήνα: Αρχείον Πόντου. (Tompaidis, D.E. and Simeonidis, C.P. 2002. Additions to the Historical Lexicon of the Pontic Dialect of A.A. Papadopoulos. Athens: Archeion Pontou.)
 Παπαδόπουλος, Α.Α. 1955. Ιστορική Γραμματική της Ποντικής Διαλέκτου. Αθήνα: Επιτροπή Ποντιακών Μελετών. (Papadopoulos, A.A. 1955. Historical Grammar of the Pontic Dialect. Athens: Committee for Pontian Studies.)
 Παπαδόπουλος, Α.Α. 1958–61. Ιστορικόν Λεξικόν της Ποντικής Διαλέκτου. 2 τόμ. Αθήνα: Μυρτίδης. (Papadopoulos, A.A. 1958–61. Historical Lexicon of the Pontic Dialect. 2 volumes. Athens: Mirtidis.)
 Οικονομίδης, Δ.Η. 1958. Γραμματική της Ελληνικής Διαλέκτου του Πόντου. Αθήνα: Ακαδημία Αθηνών. (Oikonomidis, D.I. 1958. Grammar of the Greek Dialect of Pontos. Athens: Athens Academy.)
 Τοπχαράς, Κονσταντίνος. 1998 [1932]. Η Γραμματική της Ποντιακής: Ι Γραματικι τι Ρομεικυ τι Ποντεικυ τι Γλοςας. Θεσσαλονίκη: Αφοί Κυριακίδη. (Topcharas, K. 1998 [1932]. The Grammar of Pontic. Thessaloniki: Afoi Kiriakidi.)

External links 

 Mark Janse, "Aspects of Pontic grammar", a Review Article of Drettas (1997). The paper summarizes the high points of the book.
 Committee for Pontian Studies (Επιτροπή Ποντιακών Μελετών)
 Trebizond Greek: A language without a tongue
 Pontic Greek: A cost of a language
 The Pontic Dialect
 Argonautai Komninoi Association
 Pontic Greek - English Dictionary
 Development of the Pontic Greek Dialect
 Archaic Greek in a modern world video from Cambridge University, on YouTube
Hakan Özkan (Westfälische Wilhelms-Universität), The language of the mountains - the Rumca dialect of Sürmene (Conference, 8 December 2010)

Language
Varieties of Modern Greek
Languages of Greece
Languages of Turkey
Languages of Georgia (country)
Languages of Abkhazia
Languages of Azerbaijan
Greek, Pontic
Languages of Russia
Languages of Ukraine
Languages of Armenia
Languages of Kazakhstan
Languages of Uzbekistan
Languages of the Balkans
Endangered Indo-European languages
Pontic Greek culture